Loch Ruthven is a large loch which lies to the southeast of Loch Ness in the Highland region of Scotland. The most important breeding site in the UK for Slavonian grebes, it has one of the highest populations of this species in Europe. These rare birds can also be found in several other local lochs. The RSPB has established a reserve at Loch Ruthven.

Loch Ruthven was designated a Ramsar site on 31 August 1992.

References

External links

JNCC: Profile Loch Ruthven

Ruthven
Ruthven
Special Areas of Conservation in Scotland
Ramsar sites in Scotland
Royal Society for the Protection of Birds reserves in Scotland
Ruthven